C-Bus is a home-automation product range from the Clipsal brand owned by Schneider Electric.  Since 1994 it has grown to include approximately 400 products.  It is primarily used as a Lighting control system but also supports other automation functions such as irrigation and security.

About
The initial products were labelled as 'C-Bus'.  The branding became 'C-Bus 2' in 2001 with the introduction of a feature called Learn Mode, however products of either branding are compatible and can be used together.

Communication
C-Bus products communicate using an open protocol of the same name, relayed via a pink cable that carries both power and data.  Some products require an additional mains supply.

A single bus segment, referred to as a 'C-Bus network', can address 255 individual devices.  Commercial installations can comprise a number of interconnected networks which are linked together by the use of bridges.

See also
 C-Bus (protocol)
 Intelligent building
 Smart Environments

References

External links
Clipsal's Information
High Lumen Output LEDs
LED Media Facade Lighting

Clipsal
Building automation
Home automation